Lathyrus hirsutus is a species of wild pea known by several common names, including Caley pea, singletary pea, hairy vetchling, and Austrian winter pea.  It is native to Europe, North Africa, and much of Asia, and it is known from other continents, including North America, as an introduced species.  This is an annual herb producing a winged stem and leaves each made up of two leaflike leaflets with a branching, coiled tendril.  The inflorescence holds one or two pink, blue, or bicolored pea flowers each 1 to 1.5 centimeters wide.  The fruit is a dehiscent legume pod covered in hairs with each hair growing from a minute bulbous base.  The rest of the plant is generally hairless.

References

External links 
 Jepson Manual Treatment
 
 Photo gallery

hirsutus
Flora of Europe
Flora of Serbia
Flora of Western Asia
Flora of North Africa
Flora of Egypt
Plants described in 1753
Taxa named by Carl Linnaeus